The Frilihorn is a mountain of the Swiss Pennine Alps, located between the Val d'Anniviers and the Turtmanntal in the canton of Valais.

The Frilihorn rises to a height of 10,249 ft (3,124 m), making it the 758th highest mountain in Switzerland.
It is located east of Ayer and south of Gruben. It sits to the north of Wängerhorn peak, south of Minugrat peak and south east of L'Omen Roso peak.

External links
 Frilihorn on Hikr

References

Mountains of the Alps
Alpine three-thousanders
Mountains of Switzerland
Mountains of Valais